The canton of Mortagne-sur-Sèvre is an administrative division of the Vendée department, western France. Its borders were modified at the French canton reorganisation which came into effect in March 2015. Its seat is in Mortagne-sur-Sèvre.

It consists of the following communes:
 
Beaurepaire
La Bernardière
La Bruffière
Chanverrie
Cugand
La Gaubretière
Les Landes-Genusson
Mallièvre
Mortagne-sur-Sèvre
Saint-Aubin-des-Ormeaux
Saint-Laurent-sur-Sèvre
Saint-Malô-du-Bois
Saint-Martin-des-Tilleuls
Tiffauges
Treize-Vents

References

Cantons of Vendée